Donald James McCrimmon (March 1, 1918 – November 8, 1992) was a provincial level politician from Alberta, Canada. He served as a member of the Legislative Assembly of Alberta from 1971 to 1982 sitting with the governing Progressive Conservative caucus. During his time in office McCrimmon was appointed by Premier Peter Lougheed to serve a term in the Executive Council of Alberta as  a Minister without portfolio responsible for native affairs from 1979 to 1982.

Political career
McCrimmon ran for a seat to the Alberta Legislature in the 1971 Alberta general election. He won the electoral district of Ponoka defeating incumbent Neville Roper in a hotly contested four way race. His win helped the Progressive Conservative caucus form government that year.

The 1975 Alberta general election would see McCrimmon run against two challengers. He was returned easily to his second term after winning a slightly higher popular vote while the opposition vote would remain unchanged. McCrimmon would stand for a third term in office in the 1979 Alberta general election. His popular vote would remain almost unchanged from the 1975 election while his opponents would make gains but the vote was heavily divided.

After the election Premier Peter Lougheed appointed McCrimmon to the Executive Council of Alberta as Minister without portfolio responsible for Native Affairs. He held that portfolio until he retired from the Assembly at dissolution in 1982.

References

External links
Legislative Assembly of Alberta Members Listing

1918 births
1992 deaths
Members of the Executive Council of Alberta
People from Red Deer, Alberta
Progressive Conservative Association of Alberta MLAs